Anna Zozulia (born March 10, 1980) is a Ukrainian (until 2007) and Belgian (since 2007) chess player.

Career
She is an international master, and a woman grandmaster.

Originally from Ukraine, she now lives in Belgium.

She won the girls' under-16 World Youth Chess Championship in 1996 for Ukraine, and the women's Belgian Chess Championship in 2011.

External links 

Chess woman grandmasters
Belgian female chess players
1980 births
Living people
Place of birth missing (living people)
Ukrainian female chess players
Ukrainian emigrants to Belgium
Naturalised citizens of Belgium